Psilocybe singeri is a species of mushroom in the family Hymenogastraceae.

See also
Psilocybe

References

singeri